William Stephen (1 April 1928 – 23 August 2020) was an Australian rules footballer with Fitzroy Football Club. He also coached Fitzroy and Essendon.

Playing career

Fitzroy Football Club
Recruited from Thornbury CYMS and making his debut with the Fitzroy Football Club in the VFL in 1947, Stephen was one of the best defenders in the league. He won the Fitzroy Football Club best and fairest in 1950 and 1954 and played for Victoria 14 times. He went on to play 162 games and kicked 4 goals for the club, playing prominently from the back pocket position.

Coaching career

Fitzroy Football Club
Bill Stephen coached Fitzroy as senior coach on three separate occasions from 1955 to 1957, 1965 to 1970 and 1979 to 1980.  His overall VFL coaching record stands at 258 matches, 84 wins, 172 losses and 2 draws, including the all time VFL/AFL record for most games coached without a grand final appearance. He was sacked from Fitzroy in 1970 as he was recovering in hospital from pneumonia and He resigned from his final VFL coaching appointment at the end of the 1980 season, after coaching the Lions into the finals in 1979 for the first time since 1960. Stephen was replaced by Robert Walls as Fitzroy Football Club senior coach at the end of the 1980 season.

Yarrawonga Football Club
Stephen was captain / coach of Yarrawonga in the Ovens & Murray Football League from 1958 to 1963, then was their non playing coach in 1964. Stephen led Yarrawonga to their first O&MFL premiership against Bob Rose's Wangaratta Rovers in 1959.

Stephen was also the non playing coach of the Ovens & Murray Football League inter-league side in 1964.

Essendon Football Club 
Stephen also coached Essendon as senior coach from 1976 to 1977, with a 16 win, 27 losses and 1 draw record. Stephen was sacked as Essendon Football Club senior coach at the end of the 1977 season. Stephen was then replaced by Barry Davis as Essendon Football Club senior coach.

Other coaching roles
He was also an assistant coach for South Melbourne and North Melbourne in between his stints at Fitzroy, Essendon, and St Kilda.

References

External links

Coaching statistics

1928 births
2020 deaths
Essendon Football Club coaches
Fitzroy Football Club players
Fitzroy Football Club coaches
Mitchell Medal winners
Australian rules footballers from Victoria (Australia)